Heteroconger obscurus, the obscure garden eel, is an eel in the family Congridae (conger/garden eels). It was described by Wolfgang Klausewitz and Irenäus Eibl-Eibesfeldt in 1959, originally under the genus Xarifania. It is a marine, tropical eel which is known from the eastern Indian Ocean, including the Nicobar Islands in India, and Andaman Island.

References

obscurus
Taxa named by Wolfgang Klausewitz
Fish described in 1959